Antonio Fosson (born 11 October 1951) is an Italian politician. Antonio was elected president of Aosta Valley from 10 December 2018 to 16 December 2019. Antonio is a member of the Pour Notre Vallée Party.

Biography
Antonio was born in Ivrea, Italy. But he was elected senator in 2008 from ayes. He is a member of the 12th Standing Committee on Hygiene and Health, as well as of the Parliamentary Committee on Regional Questions.

Career
At the 2018 regional elections in Valle d'Aosta he was re-elected from the common list with Stella Alpina. On 26 June 2018 he was elected President of the Valle d'Aosta Regional Council at the beginning of the XV Aosta Valley legislature with 18 preferences. In October he left the group "AC-Stella Alpina-Pour Notre Vallée" to join the mixed group together with his party colleague Claudio Restano. In 2013 he returned to the Conseil de la Vallée and as an assessor for health and social policy, which he resigned in June 2016. A few months later he left his parent party and founded the group Pour Notre Vallée. In 2018 he was re-elected from the joint list of Area civica – Stella Alpina – Pour notre vallée, then from June to December 2018 he was the chairman of parliament he also joined the new federation club. On 10 December 2018, after changing the government coalition and excluding the League, he was appointed president of the Aosta Valley.

References

External links

 Antonio Fosson on Openpolis

1951 births
Living people
21st-century Italian politicians
Presidents of Aosta Valley
People from Ivrea